Gator Bait (U.K. title: Swamp Bait) is a 1974 film written, produced, and directed by Beverly Sebastian and Ferd Sebastian.

The film starred former Playboy "Playmate of the Year" Claudia Jennings. It was followed by the sequel 'Gator Bait II: Cajun Justice.

Plot
The film follows a barefoot poacher named Desiree Thibodeau who lives deep in the swampland. Ben Bracken and Deputy Billy Boy find Desiree trapping alligators and chase her, looking to rape her. Desiree outsmarts the two men. During the chase, however, Billy Boy accidentally shoots Ben. Billy Boy tells his father, Sheriff Joe Bob Thomas, that Desiree was the shooter. Sheriff Thomas and his son join a search party who is also looking for Desiree and attack her family. Desiree exacts her revenge against the attackers.

Cast

See also
 List of American films of 1974

References

External links
 

1974 films
1970s English-language films
American action thriller films
1970s action thriller films
Dimension Pictures films
American rape and revenge films
Films directed by Beverly Sebastian
Films directed by Ferd Sebastian
1970s American films